John F. Bateman (1913 – January 1, 1998) was an American football player and coach.  He served as the head football coach at Rutgers University from 1960 to 1972, compiling a record of 73–51.  Bateman played college football at Columbia University, from which he graduated in 1938.  He was voted co-captain of the Columbia Lions football team in 1937.  Bateman died at the age of 83 on January 1, 1998 in New London, New Hampshire.

Head coaching record

References

1913 births
1998 deaths
American football guards
Columbia Lions football coaches
Columbia Lions football players
Penn Quakers football coaches
Rutgers Scarlet Knights football coaches
People from New London, New Hampshire